Palo del Colle  is a town and comune in the Metropolitan City of Bari, Apulia, southern Italy. 
It is on a hill (hence the name "Pole on the Hill").

References

Cities and towns in Apulia